The Chess World Cup 2021 was a 206-player single-elimination chess tournament that took place in Sochi, Russia, beginning 12 July and ending 6 August 2021. It was the 9th edition of the Chess World Cup. The winner of this tournament was the Polish GM Jan-Krzysztof Duda, who won without losing any games either in classical chess or in the rapid tiebreakers.

The two finalists (Duda and Sergey Karjakin) qualified for the Candidates Tournament 2022. The rest of the final eight, except Magnus Carlsen, qualified for the FIDE Grand Prix 2022.

In parallel with this open tournament, an inaugural women-only version was held.

Format
The tournament was an 8-round knockout event, with the top 50 seeds given a bye directly into the second round. The losers of the two semi-finals played a match for third place.

The two finalists, Jan-Krzysztof Duda and Sergey Karjakin qualified for the Candidates Tournament 2022, which is a tournament to decide the next challenger for the World Championship. Moreover, all quarter-finalists, except for World Champion Magnus Carlsen, qualified for the FIDE Grand Prix 2022, giving them another chance to qualify for the Candidates.

Each round consisted of classical time limit games on the first two days, plus tie-breaks on the third day if required. The time limits were as follows:
 Two classical time limit games: 90 minutes, plus a 30-minute increment on move 40, plus a 30-second increment per move from move 1, per player.
 If the match was tied after the classical games, players played two rapid chess games, with 25 minutes plus a 10-second increment per move, per player.
 If the match was still tied, players then played two more rapid chess games, with 10 minutes plus a 10-second increment per move, per player.
 If the match was still tied, players then played two blitz games, with 5 minutes plus a 3-second increment per move, per player.
 If the match was still tied, a single armageddon chess game was played to decide the match, with draw odds to Black, meaning White had to win but Black only needed to draw or win, to win the match. The players drew lots and the winner of the draw chose their color. White received 5 minutes, Black received 4 minutes, and each player received an extra 2 seconds per move beginning at move 61.

Schedule
Each round lasted three days: two for classical time limit games and a third, if necessary, for tie-breaks. Rounds 1 to 3 ran from July 12 to 20; July 21 was a rest day; Rounds 4 to 6 ran from July 22 to 30; July 31 was a rest day; and the last two rounds ran from August 1 to 6.

Play began at 3:00pm local time (1200 UT) on all days.

Prize money
The total prize fund was US$1,892,500, with the first prize of US$110,000.

Media

IM Eric Rosen was one of the official photographers for the event.

Participants
The following is the list of participants. Players were seeded by their FIDE rating of June 2021, and all players were grandmasters unless indicated otherwise.

 , 2847 (World Champion)
 , 2820 (R)
 , 2781 (R)
 , 2780 (R)
 , 2776 (R)
 , 2770 (R)
 , 2760 (WC)
 , 2759 (R)
 , 2758 (R)
 , 2757 (R)
 , 2730 (R)
 , 2729 (ER)
 , 2726 (R)
 , 2724 (ER)
 , 2724 (ER)
 , 2716 (E)
 , 2714 (ER)
 , 2714 (ER)
 , 2710 (ER)
 , 2709 (Z2.1)
 , 2706 (E)
 , 2705 (WC)
 , 2704 (E)
 , 2703 (AF)
 , 2701 (R)
 , 2699 (ER)
 , 2699 (ER)
 , 2698 (AS)
 , 2697 (ER)
 , 2696 (E)
 , 2691 (Z2.1)
 , 2688 (E)
 , 2687 (ER)
 , 2687 (R)
 , 2684 (R)
 , 2683 (E)
 , 2683 (R)
 , 2682 (R)
 , 2682 (FN)
 , 2680 (FN)
 , 2678 (FN)
 , 2675 (R)
 , 2673 (FN)
 , 2673 (E)
 , 2670 (FN)
 , 2669 (FN)
 , 2667 (E)
 , 2666 (R)
 , 2665 (PN)
 , 2662 (FN)
 , 2661 (E)
 , 2660 (FN)
 , 2660 (Z2.1) 
 , 2656 (E)
 , 2654 (E)
 , 2653 (FN)
 , 2652 (Z2.4)
 , 2649 (Z2.1) 
 , 2648 (E)
 , 2645 (FN)
 , 2641 (Z3.7)
 , 2640 (PN) 
 , 2639 (E)
 , 2639 (FN)
 , 2638 (Z2.2)
 , 2637 (FN)
 , 2637 (PN)
 , 2634 (Z3.4)
 , 2630 (FN)
 , 2630 (E)
 , 2629 (PN)
 , 2629 (AM)
 , 2627 (E)
 , 2627 (E)
 , 2625 (AF)
 , 2624 (FN)
 , 2622 (Z2.5)
 , 2620 (PN)
 , 2620 (FN)
 , 2618 (E)
 , 2617 (FN)
 , 2615 (E)
 , 2614 (E)
 , 2614 (PN)
 , 2614 (FN)
 , 2613 (AS)
 , 2609 (E)
 , 2608 (E)
 , 2608 (FN)
 , 2608 (PN)
 , 2607 (E)
 , 2606 (AM)
 , 2606 (FN)
 , 2606 (Z2.1)
 , 2606 (E)
 , 2605 (E)
 , 2603 (FN)
 , 2603 (E)
 , 2599 (AM)
 , 2598 (Z3.4) 
 , 2594 (FN)
 , 2592 (E)
 , 2591 (E)
 , 2591 (FN)
 , 2590 (E)
 , 2589 (FN)
 , 2586 (PN)
 , 2581 (FN)
 , 2581 (FN)
 , 2581 (FN)
 , 2579 (FN)
 , 2578 (PN)
 , 2577 (E)
 , 2573 (Z2.3)
 , 2569 (E)
 , 2569 (FN)
 , 2568 (FN)
 , 2565 (FN)
 , 2564 (E)
 , 2564 (FN)
 , 2558 (AS)
 , 2555 (AM)
 , 2554 (AM)
 , 2554 (Z2.5)
 , 2553 (E)
 , 2552 (FN)
 , 2550 (FN)
 , 2548 (E)
 , 2548 (FN)
 , 2547 (Z3.1) 
 , 2546 (FN)
 , 2542 (E)
 , 2542 (FN)
 , 2540 (FN)
 , 2539 (Z1.10)
 , 2538 (AM)
 , 2534 (FN)
 , 2530 (AS)
 , 2527 (AM)
 , 2527 (FN)
 , 2523 (PN)
 , 2522 (Z2.4)
 , 2521 (FN)
 , 2518 (E)
 , 2514 (E)
 , 2514 (FN)
 , 2514 (AM)
 , 2508 (FN)
 , 2506 (IAS)
 , 2504 (FN)
 , 2502 (FN)
 , 2499 (FN)
 , 2493 (FN)
 , 2492 (FN)
 , 2490 (Z2.3)
 , 2488 (FN)
 , 2487 (FN)
 , 2486 (ON)
 , 2485 (PN)
 , 2485 (FN)
 , 2485 (AF)
 , 2484 (FN)
 , 2482 (AS)
 , 2480 (FN)
 , 2478 (FN)
 , 2469 (FN)
 , 2462 (FN)
 , 2460 (ON)
 , 2440 (FN)
 , 2438 (FN)
 , 2435 (FN)
 , 2434 (Z3.2) 
 , 2430 (FN)
 , 2425 (FN)
 , 2420 (FN)
 , 2419 (AS)
 , 2417 (FN)
 , 2411 (FN)
 , 2409 (FN)
 , 2404 (FN)
 , 2403 (FN)
 , 2397 (AF)
 , 2396 (FN)
 , 2390 (FN)
 , 2382 (FN)
 , 2379 (FN)
 , 2367 (FN)
 , 2365 (FN)
 , 2356 (AS)
 , 2352 (FN)
 , 2340 (FN)
 , 2319 (Z3.3)
 , 2313 (FN)
 , 2307 (FN)
 , 2302 (FN)
 , 2297 (Z3.3)
 , 2286 (FN)
 , 2281 (FN)
 , 2274 (FN)
 , 2244 (FN)
 , 2205 (FN)
 , 2203 (FN)
 , 2193 (FN)
 , 2155 (FN)
 , 2103 (PN)
 , 1998 (Z3.6)

Players qualifying for the event included:
 The world chess champion 
 The women's world chess champion (WWC)
 The 2019 World Junior Champion U20 (U20)
 The top four players in the Chess World Cup 2019 (WC)
 89 players qualifying from Continental events:
Europe (47): High rating (ER, 10), Hybrid qualification (E, 36), Zonal 1.10 (Z1.10, 1)
America (11+9): Hybrid qualification (AM, 8), Zonals 2.1 (Z2.1, 5), 2.2 (Z2.2, 1), 2.3 (Z2.3, 2), 2.4 (Z2.4, 2), 2.5 (Z2.5, 2) 
Asia (18): Hybrid Asian Championship 2021 (AS, 7), Indian Qualification (IAS, 1), Zonals 3.1 (Z3.1, 1), 3.2 (Z3.2, 1), 3.3 (Z3.3, 2), 3.4 (Z3.4, 2), 3.5 (Z3.5, 2), 3.6 (Z3.6, 1), 3.7 (Z3.7, 1)
Africa (4): African Chess Championship (AF, 4)
 The 13 highest-rated players from the average of 12 rating lists, from July 2020 to June 2021 (R)
 91 federations spots selected according to the average rating of their 10 highest rated players (FN).

 4 nominees of the FIDE President (PN)
 2 nominees of the organizer (ON)

The participants were seeded by their FIDE rating of June 2021. For the first time, a hybrid format of online chess under arbiter supervision was allowed to be a part of the qualification process, due to the difficulties caused by the COVID-19 pandemic in organizing over the board competition.

Replacements 
The following are the players from the list of qualifiers who declined to play, and their replacements:
  (WC) →  (R). Radjabov already had a wildcard placement for the 2022 Candidates.
  (WC) →  (R). Ding Liren did not play because of China's COVID-19 travel restrictions, and also because he was committed to playing in a Chinese tournament.
  (U20) →  (R)
  (WWC) →  (R)
  (R) →  (R). Nepomniachtchi was preparing for the World Chess Championship 2021 match against Carlsen.
  (R) →  (R). COVID-19 reasons.
  (R) →  (R)
  (R) →  (R). Wang Hao had retired from competitive chess.
  (R) →  (R). Anand was already committed to playing the Dortmund Sparkassen Chess Meeting between July 10 and 18.
  (AS) →  (AS)
  (ER) →  (ER)
  (ER) →  (ER)
  (E) →  (E)
  (Z1.10) →  (Z1.10)
  (Z3.6) →  (Z3.6). Kuybokarov withdrew due to Australian travel restrictions due to COVID-19.
  (Z3.5) → an extra presidential nominee (PN)
  (Z3.5) → an extra presidential nominee (PN)

In addition, six federations (Bosnia and Herzegovina, China, Japan, South Korea, Peru, Vietnam) did not nominate a player. Because of this and the two Zone 3.5 withdrawals, the number of presidential nominees (PN) increased from four to twelve, with the eight extra being:
 (PN)
 (PN)
 (PN)
 (PN)
 (PN)
 (PN)
 (PN)
 (PN)

Results

Rounds 1–4

Section 1

Section 2

Section 3

Section 4

Section 5

Section 6

Section 7

Section 8

Section 9

Section 10

Section 11

Section 12

Section 13

Section 14

Section 15

Section 16

Rounds 5–8

Third place

Finals

Notes

References

See also 
 Women's Chess World Cup 2021

External links
 FIDE World Cup 2021, official site, FIDE.

2021
Chess World Cup
Chess in Russia
Chess World Cup
Chess World Cup
Chess World Cup